Jane Nyambura (1964/1965 – June 29, 2010), better known by her stage name Queen Jane was a Kenyan benga musician performing in Kikuyu language. 

Queen Jane was born in Kangema, Murang'a County. She started her musical career in 1984 as a back up vocalist for Mbiri Young Stars under the band leader Musaimo (Simon Kihara). She formed her own band Queenja Les Les and released her debut album Ndorogonye in 1991, produced by Lemanco Productions 

Her career reached prominence a year later upon the release of her hit song Mwendwa KK. Her other hits include Ndutige Kwiyaba, Muici Wa Itura, Muthuri Teenager and Arume Ni Nyamu. Many of her songs handled social issues. 

Her last album Gikuyu Giitu (Our Gikuyu (Language/tribe)) was released in early 2010. Maina David Mithu of Leemax Studio has been one of her producers.

She won awards from the Music Copyright Society of Kenya (MCSK) and Music Composers Association. Her song Nduraga Ngwetereire (I've been Waiting for You) was released on The Rough Guide to the Music of Kenya compilation CD.

Queen Jane died of meningitis on June 29, 2010, at St Mary's Hospital in Nairobi after a spell of illness. Her funeral was postponed as her relatives disputed over the place of her burial. 

She was survived by husband Kariuki Mburu. Her siblings Ejidiah Wanja (aka Lady Wanja) and Agnes Wangui (Princess Aggie) are also musicians. Kenyan politician John Michuki, who deceased in 2012 was her uncle.

Discography 
 Mwendwa KK
 Ndutige Kwiyamba
 Guka Nindarega
 Maheni ti Thiiri
 Mwana wa Ndigwa Muici wa Itura
 Muthuri Teenager
 Arume Ni Nyamu
 Arume ni Njegeni
 Nduraga Ngwetereire
 Cirū Witū
 Nyūmba Kīrīrīshwa
 Ndīmūnogu
 Mwendwa Nyumbūrīra
 Nowe Dawa
 Twaremire Nderi 
 Maprofessor

References

1960s births
Year of birth uncertain
2010 deaths
20th-century Kenyan women singers
Deaths from meningitis
Infectious disease deaths in Kenya
Neurological disease deaths in Kenya
21st-century Kenyan women singers